Shuguang Subdistrict is a subdistrict situated at the center of Haidian District, Beijing, China. It is bordering Wangliu Area in its north, Haidian and Zizhuyuan Subdistricts in its east, Balizhuang Subdistrict in its south, Tiancun Road Subdistrict and Sijiqing Town in its west. In the year 2020, it had a population of 86,181. 

The subdistrict was established in 2004. Its name Shuguang was from an anonymous poem.

Administrative Divisions 
Shuguang Subdistrict was divided into 17 communities as of 2021:

See also 

 List of township-level divisions of Beijing

References 

Haidian District
Subdistricts of Beijing